The Rörstrand Ladies Open  was a women's professional golf tournament on the Swedish Golf Tour played annually from 1991 until 1997. It was always held at the Lidköping Golf Club in Lidköping, Sweden.

The tournament attracted top female Swedish golfers and in 1991 future Ladies European Tour (LET) player Maria Bertilsköld won, while Marie Wennersten, winner of the 1985 Mitsubishi Colt Cars Jersey Open finished third, and Åsa Gottmo, eventual winner of the Wales Ladies Championship of Europe, finished fifth.

1993 marked the tournament's peak, with many international players from the LET taking part, boasting a field including 13-time LET winner Corinne Dibnah, LET/LPGA winners Mardi Lunn, Debbie Dowling, Carin Koch, Sofia Grönberg-Whitmore and that year's winner Dale Reid, a Scottish golfing legend with 21 European Tour victories. On the cusp of breaking through and become LPGA Rookie of the Year 1994, Annika Sörenstam finished 14th, 8 strokes behind Reid.

In 1996 Sophie Gustafson, who would go on to win 16 times on the Ladies European Tour, secured her first professional win head of her maiden LET victory at the Ladies Swiss Open three weeks later. Runner-up Maria Hjorth, the 1995 European Ladies Amateur Champion, had just turned professional and would soon go on to win five times on the LPGA Tour and play 5 Solheim Cups. Charlotta Sörenstam finished tied for 7th, 7 strokes behind Gustafson.

Winners

References

Swedish Golf Tour (women) events
Golf tournaments in Sweden
Sport in Sweden
Recurring sporting events established in 1991
Recurring sporting events disestablished in 1997